S. Sudharsanam is an Indian politician and a Member of Legislative Assembly of Tamil Nadu. He was elected from Madavaram as a Dravida Munnetra Kazhagam candidate in 2021.

Electoral performance

References 

Tamil Nadu MLAs 2021–2026
Living people
Dravida Munnetra Kazhagam politicians
Tamil Nadu MLAs 2016–2021
Year of birth missing (living people)